Kazakhstan competed at the 1998 Winter Paralympics in Nagano, Japan. One competitor, Sergey Lozhkin, from Kazakhstan won no medals and so did not place in the medal table. He competed in one event in biathlon and in three events in cross-country skiing.

See also 
 Kazakhstan at the Paralympics
 Kazakhstan at the 1998 Winter Olympics

References 

Kazakhstan at the Paralympics
1998 in Kazakhstani sport
Nations at the 1998 Winter Paralympics